The Death Trip Continues is the first EP by American heavy metal band Static-X, released in 2000. It is following their debut album, Wisconsin Death Trip.  This EP was a promo CD only and was not available in stores.

Track listing
"Love Dump (Edit)"
"Love Dump (Mephisto Odyssey Remix)"
"Bled for Days (Edit)"
"Bled for Days (Live)"
"Burning Inside" (Ministry cover)
"So Real"
"S.O.M. (Symptoms of Mercy)”

Personnel
Wayne Static - lead vocals, rhythm guitar
Koichi Fukuda - lead guitar, keyboards, programming
Tony Campos - bass, backing vocals
Ken Jay - drums

2000 EPs
Static-X EPs
Warner Records EPs